Space Station 3D (simply known as Space Station in 2D format) is a 2002 Canadian-American 3D short documentary film about the International Space Station written, produced, edited and directed by Toni Myers. Narrated by Tom Cruise, it is the first IMAX 3D production filmed in space.

Content
Space Station 3D was the first 3D live-action film to be shot in space. Using advanced 3D technology, the film tells the story of the greatest engineering feat since men landed on the Moon; the on-orbit assembly of the International Space Station as it travels 220 miles above the Earth at 17,500 mph. The film included sequences that portray the force of a rocket launch, look into the depths of space, experience life in zero gravity and accompany astronauts on a space walk."

Release
The film is the highest-grossing film never to have placed in the top 10 domestic box office, grossing $93,376,342 domestically and $34,971,266 overseas for a total worldwide gross of $128,347,608.

Reception
Space Station 3D has received positive reviews. On review aggregator website Rotten Tomatoes, the film has a rating of 87%, based on 23 reviews, with an average rating of 6.93/10. Metacritic gives the film a score of 69 out of 100, based on 13 critics, indicating "generally favorable reviews".

See also

 List of films featuring space stations

References

External links
 
 
 
 
 

2002 films
2002 3D films
2002 short documentary films
Canadian 3D films
Canadian short documentary films
American 3D films
American short documentary films
Documentary films about outer space
Films shot in Florida
Films shot in Kazakhstan
IMAX short films
International Space Station
Films about NASA
Films directed by Toni Myers
IMAX documentary films
Films scored by Maribeth Solomon
Films scored by Micky Erbe
3D short films
3D documentary films
Films shot in space
2000s English-language films
2000s American films
2000s Canadian films